The Pope Model L was a motorcycle produced by Pope Manufacturing Company in Westfield, Massachusetts, between 1914 and 1920.

It was technologically advanced for its time, with features not found on other motorcycles, such as overhead valves, chain drive (from 1918) and multi-speed transmission. It was also expensive at $250, as much then as a Model T automobile. (Another source of competition were cyclecars)

Specifications
Specifications in infobox to the right are from the Smithsonian Institution.

Postage stamp

A five cent United States postage stamp was issued in October, 1983, with an engraved image of the Pope Model L.

See also
List of motorcycles of the 1910s
FN Four
Sears Dreadnought
Thor Model U
List of fastest production motorcycles

References

External links

 

 
 

Motorcycles of the United States
Motorcycles introduced in the 1910s